The Chilean Council of State was a body set up by the junta of General Augusto Pinochet to produce a constitution in order to legitimise military rule.  The constitution which it produced was approved in a 1980 plebiscite.

The President of the Council of State was former President Jorge Alessandri.

See also
Politics of Chile
Constitution of Chile

Government of Chile